Ohara is the Romanized Japanese form of two Japanese surnames,  and . Notable people with either surname include:

 Chiaki Ohara, pianist
 Hajime Ohara, professional wrestler
 Hiroo Ōhara, former Governor of Hiroshima Prefecture, Japan
 Joji Ohara, cinematographer
 Ken Ohara, photographer
 Ohara Koson, painter and printmaker
 Kōyū Ohara, film director
 Magosaburō Ōhara, businessman and philanthropist
 Mariko Ōhara, science fiction writer
 Michiyoshi Ohara, professional wrestler and mixed martial artist
 Misuzu Ohara, the real name of singer songwriter Amii Ozaki
 , Japanese politician
 Noriko Ohara (born 1935), voice actress
Noriko Ohara (born 1943), ballet dancer
 Reiko Ohara, actress
 Sakurako Ohara (born 1996), actress and singer
 Sayaka Ohara, voice actress
, Japanese footballer
 Takashi Ōhara, voice actor
, Japanese singer

Fictional characters
 Lt. Ohara, detective played by Pat Morita in the American television program Ohara (TV series)
 Mari Ohara, fictional character from the media-mix project Love Live! Sunshine!!
 Shota Ohara (大原翔太), a main character from Little Ghost Q-Taro
 Shinichi Ohara, a main character's older brother from Little Ghost Q-Taro

Japanese-language surnames